One Day International (ODI) cricket is played between international cricket teams who are Full Members of the International Cricket Council (ICC) as well as the top four Associate members. Unlike Test matches, ODIs consist of one inning per team, having a limit in the number of overs, currently 50 overs per innings – although in the past this has been 55 or 60 overs. ODI cricket is List-A cricket, so statistics and records set in ODI matches also count toward List-A records. The earliest match recognised as an ODI was played between England and Australia in January 1971; since when there have been over 4,000 ODIs played by 28 teams. 
This is a list of Ireland Cricket team's One Day International records. It is based on the List of One Day International cricket records, but concentrates solely on records dealing with the Irish cricket team.

Key
The top five records are listed for each category, except for the team wins, losses, draws and ties, all round records and the partnership records. Tied records for fifth place are also included. Explanations of the general symbols and cricketing terms used in the list are given below. Specific details are provided in each category where appropriate. All records include matches played for Ireland only, and are correct .

Team records

Overall record

Team wins, losses, draws and ties 
, Ireland has played 176 ODI matches resulting in 74 victories, 89 defeats, 3 ties and 10 no results for an overall winning percentage of 45.48.

First bilateral ODI series wins

First ODI match wins

Winning every match in a series 
In a bilateral series winning all matches is referred to as whitewash. First such event occurred when West Indies toured England in 1976. Ireland have recorded two such series victories.

Losing every match in a series 
Ireland have also suffered such whitewash three times.

Team scoring records

Most runs in an innings
The highest innings total scored in ODIs came in the match played between England and the Netherlands in June 2022. Playing in the first ODI at VRA Cricket Ground in Amstelveen, the visiting team posted a total of 498/4. The 2015 Cricket World Cup game against Zimbabwe in Hobart saw Ireland set their highest innings total of 331/8. Another game against Scotland in the 2017–18 United Arab Emirates Tri-Nation Series saw them post 331/6 at Dubai.

Fewest runs in an innings
The lowest innings total scored in ODIs has been scored twice. Zimbabwe were dismissed for 35 by Sri Lanka during the third ODI in Sri Lanka's tour of Zimbabwe in April 2004 and USA were dismissed for same score by Nepal in the sixth ODI of the 2020 ICC Cricket World League 2 in Nepal in February 2020. The lowest score in ODI history for Ireland is 77 against Sri Lanka during the 2007 Cricket World Cup at St. George's, Grenada.

Most runs conceded an innings
The highest innings total scored in ODIs against Ireland was during the 2015 Cricket World Cup when South Africa scored 411/4 at Manuka Oval in Canberra.

Fewest runs conceded in an innings
The lowest score conceded by Ireland for a full inning is 91 scored by UAE in the 2018 ICC Cricket World Cup Qualifier.

Most runs aggregate in a match
The highest match aggregate scored in ODIs came in the match between South Africa and Australia in the fifth ODI of March 2006 series at Wanderers Stadium, Johannesburg when South Africa scored 438/9 in response to Australia's 434/4. The highest aggregate involving Ireland is 658 against West Indies in the 2019 Ireland Tri-Series.

Fewest runs aggregate in a match
The lowest match aggregate in ODIs is 71 when USA were dismissed for 35 by Nepal in the sixth ODI of the 2020 ICC Cricket World League 2 in Nepal in February 2020. The lowest match aggregate in ODI history for Ireland is 158 scored in the 2007 Cricket World Cup game against Sri Lanka.

Result records
An ODI match is won when one side has scored more runs than the total runs scored by the opposing side during their innings. If both sides have completed both their allocated innings and the side that fielded last has the higher aggregate of runs, it is known as a win by runs. This indicates the number of runs that they had scored more than the opposing side. If the side batting last wins the match, it is known as a win by wickets, indicating the number of wickets that were still to fall.

Greatest win margins (by runs)
The greatest winning margin by runs in ODIs was New Zealand's victory over Ireland by 290 runs in the only ODI of the 2008 England tour. The next largest victory was recorded by Ireland was during the 2018 ICC Cricket World Cup Qualifier by 226 runs against the UAE.

Greatest win margins (by balls remaining)
The greatest winning margin by balls remaining in ODIs was England's victory over Canada by 8 wickets with 277 balls remaining in the 1979 Cricket World Cup. The largest victory recorded by Ireland is against the Netherlands when they won by 9 wickets with 177 balls remaining.

Greatest win margins (by wickets)
A total of 55 matches have ended with chasing team winning by 10 wickets with West Indies winning by such margins a record 10 times. Ireland have not won an ODI match by this margin.

Highest successful run chases
South Africa holds the record for the highest successful run chase which they achieved when they scored 438/9 in response to Australia's 434/9. Ireland's highest innings total while chasing is 329/7 in a successful run chase against England at Bangalore during the 2011 Cricket World Cup, which at that time was the highest successful chase in a World Cup, and 329/3 in the third ODI of the Ireland's tour of England in 2020 during the 2020–22 ICC Cricket World Cup Super League.

Narrowest win margins (by runs)
The narrowest run margin victory is by 1 run which has been achieved in 31 ODI's with Ireland winning such games once.

Narrowest win margins (by balls remaining)
The narrowest winning margin by balls remaining in ODIs is by winning of the last ball which has been achieved 36 times with both South Africa winning seven times. Ireland have not yet achieved victory by this margin.

Narrowest win margins (by wickets)
The narrowest margin of victory by wickets is 1 wicket which has settled 55 such ODIs. Both West Indies and New Zealand have recorded such victory on eight occasions. Ireland has won the match by a margin of one wicket on one occasion.

Greatest loss margins (by runs)
Ireland's biggest defeat by runs was against New Zealand in the only ODI of the 2008 England tour with the visitors winning by 290 runs.

Greatest loss margins (by balls remaining)
The greatest winning margin by balls remaining in ODIs was England's victory over Canada by 8 wickets with 277 balls remaining in the 1979 Cricket World Cup. The largest defeat suffered by Ireland was against Sri Lanka in 2007 Cricket World Cup when they lost by 8 wickets with 240 balls remaining.

Greatest loss margins (by wickets)
Ireland have not ODI match by a margin of 9 wickets on three occasions.

Narrowest loss margins (by runs)
The narrowest loss of Ireland in terms of runs is by 1 run suffered against Netherlands in 2021.

Narrowest loss margins (by balls remaining)
The narrowest winning margin by balls remaining in ODIs is by winning of the last ball which has been achieved 36 times with South Africa winning seven times. Ireland has suffered loss by this margin on two occasions.

Narrowest loss margins (by wickets)
Ireland has suffered defeat by 1 wicket two times with most recent being against West Indies during the second ODI of the 2020 tour of the West Indies.

Tied matches 
A tie can occur when the scores of both teams are equal at the conclusion of play, provided that the side batting last has completed their innings. 
There have been 38 ties in ODIs history with Ireland involved in 3 such games.

Individual records

Batting records

Most career runs
A run is the basic means of scoring in cricket.
India's Sachin Tendulkar has scored the most runs in ODIs with 18,246. Second is Kumar Sangakkara of Sri Lanka with 14,234 ahead of Ricky Ponting from Australia in third with 13,704. Paul Stirling is the leading Irish batsmen with 5,047 runs.

Fastest runs getter

Most runs in each batting position

Most runs against each team

Highest individual score
The second ODI of the Ireland's tour of Canada in 010 saw Paul Stirling score the highest individual score for Ireland.

Highest individual score – progression of record

Highest score against each opponent

Highest career average
A batsman's batting average is the total number of runs they have scored divided by the number of times they have been dismissed.

Highest Average in each batting position

Most half-centuries
A half-century is a score of between 50 and 99 runs. Statistically, once a batsman's score reaches 100, it is no longer considered a half-century but a century.

Sachin Tendulkar of India has scored the most half-centuries in ODIs with 96. He is followed by the Sri Lanka's Kumar Sangakkara on 93, South Africa's Jacques Kallis on 86 and India's Rahul Dravid and Pakistan's Inzamam-ul-Haq on 83. Paul Stirling is the highest rated Irish with 26 fifties.

Most centuries
A century is a score of 100 or more runs in a single innings.

Paul Stirling is the leading Irish batsman with 12 centuries.

Most Sixes

Most Fours

Highest strike rates
Andre Russell of West Indies holds the record for highest strike rate, with minimum 500 balls faced qualification, with 130.22.Trent Johnston is the Irishman with the highest strike rate.

Highest strike rates in an inning
James Franklin of New Zealand's strike rate of 387.50 during his 31* off 8 balls against Canada during 2011 Cricket World Cup is the world record for highest strike rate in an innings. Dave Langford-Smith is the highest rated Irishmen on this list.

Most runs in a calendar year
Tendulkar holds the record for most runs scored in a calendar year with 1894 runs scored in 1998. Stirling is the highest ranked Irish batsmen with 771 runs in 2010.

Most runs in a series
The 1980-81 Benson & Hedges World Series Cup in Australia saw Greg Chappell set the record for the most runs scored in a single series scoring 685 runs. Ed Joyce holds the corresponding record for Ireland.

Most ducks
A duck refers to a batsman being dismissed without scoring a run. 
Sanath Jayasuriya has scored the equal highest number of ducks in ODIs with 34 such knocks. Stirling holds the dubious record for Ireland.

Bowling records

Most career wickets 
A bowler takes the wicket of a batsman when the form of dismissal is bowled, caught, leg before wicket, stumped or hit wicket. If the batsman is dismissed by run out, obstructing the field, handling the ball, hitting the ball twice or timed out the bowler does not receive credit.

Ireland's leading wicket taker is Kevin O'Brien with 113 wickets taken so far in ODIs.

Fastest wicket taker

Most career wickets against each team

Best figures in an innings 
Bowling figures refers to the number of the wickets a bowler has taken and the number of runs conceded.
Sri Lanka's Chaminda Vaas holds the world record for best figures in an innings when he took 8/19 against Zimbabwe in December 2001 at Colombo (SSC). Paul Stirling holds the Ireland record for best bowling figures.

Best figures in an innings – progression of record

Best Bowling Figure against each opponent

Best career average 
A bowler's bowling average is the total number of runs they have conceded divided by the number of wickets they have taken.
Afghanistan's Rashid Khan holds the record for the best career average in ODIs with 18.54. Joel Garner, West Indian cricketer, and a member of the highly regarded late 1970s and early 1980s West Indies cricket teams, is second behind Rashid with an overall career average of 18.84 runs per wicket. Boyd Rankin of Ireland is the highest ranked Irish bowler when the qualification of 2000 balls bowled is followed.

Best career economy rate 
A bowler's economy rate is the total number of runs they have conceded divided by the number of overs they have bowled.
West Indies' Joel Garner, holds the ODI record for the best career economy rate with 3.09. Trent Johnston, with a rate of 4.33 runs per over conceded over his 67-match ODI career, is the highest Irish bowler on the list when the qualification of 2000 balls bowled is followed.

Best career strike rate 
A bowler's strike rate is the total number of balls they have bowled divided by the number of wickets they have taken.
The top bowler with the best ODI career strike rate is Australia's Ryan Harris with strike rate of 23.4 balls per wicket. South Africa's Lungi Ngidi is at third position in this list.

Most four-wickets (& over) hauls in an innings 
Brett Lee is joint-third on the list of most four-wicket hauls behind Pakistan's Waqar Younis and Sri Lanka's Muttiah Muralitharan.

Most five-wicket hauls in a match 
A five-wicket haul refers to a bowler taking five wickets in a single innings.
Seven Irish bowlers have taken a five-wicket haul once in their career.

Best economy rates in an inning 
The best economy rate in an inning, when a minimum of 30 balls are delivered by the player, is West Indies player Phil Simmons economy of 0.30 during his spell of 3 runs for 4 wickets in 10 overs against Pakistan at Sydney Cricket Ground in the 1991–92 Australian Tri-Series. Alex Cusack holds the Ireland record during his spell against Scotland at Aberdeen in 2009.

Best strike rates in an inning 
The best strike rate in an inning, when a minimum of 4 wickets are taken by the player, is shared by Sunil Dhaniram of Canada, Paul Collingwood of England and Virender Sehwag of India when they achieved a striekk rate of 4.2 balls per wicket. McGrath has the best strike rate for Ireland during his spell of 7/15 against Namibia at the 2003 Cricket World Cup.

Worst figures in an innings 
The worst figures in an ODI came in the 5th One Day International between South Africa at home to Australia in 2006. Australia's Mick Lewis returned figures of 0/113 from his 10 overs in the second innings of the match. The worst figure for Ireland are 0/95 which came off the bowling of Peter Connell in July 2008.

Most runs conceded in a match 
Connell also holds the dubious distinction of most runs conceded by an Ireland bowler in an ODI during the aforementioned match.

Most wickets in a calendar year 
Pakistan's Saqlain Mushtaq holds the record for most wickets taken in a year when he took 69 wickets in 1997 in 36 ODIs. Ireland's Shane Warne is joint-third on the list having taken 62 wickets in 1999.

Most wickets in a series 
1998–99 Carlton and United Series involving Australia, England and Sri Lanka and the 2019 Cricket World Cup saw the records set for the most wickets taken by a bowler in an ODI series when Australian pacemen Glenn McGrath and Mitchell Starc achieved a total of 27 wickets during the series, respectively. The most wickets taken by an Irish bowler is 14 by George Dockrell during the 2011–13 ICC World Cricket League Championship.

Wicket-keeping records
The wicket-keeper is a specialist fielder who stands behind the stumps being guarded by the batsman on strike and is the only member of the fielding side allowed to wear gloves and leg pads.

Most career dismissals
A wicket-keeper can be credited with the dismissal of a batsman in two ways, caught or stumped. A fair catch is taken when the ball is caught fully within the field of play without it bouncing after the ball has touched the striker's bat or glove holding the bat, Laws 5.6.2.2 and 5.6.2.3 state that the hand or the glove holding the bat shall be regarded as the ball striking or touching the bat while a stumping occurs when the wicket-keeper puts down the wicket while the batsman is out of his ground and not attempting a run.
Ireland's Niall O'Brien has made the most dismissals in ODIs as a designated wicket-keeper with Sri Lanka's Kumar Sangakkara and Australia's Adam Gilchrist leading the list.

Most career catches
Niall O'Brien holds the Irish record in taking most catches in ODIs as a designated wicket-keeper.

Most career stumpings
Niall O'Brien holds the Irish record for the most stumpings in ODIs.

Most dismissals in an innings
Ten wicket-keepers on 15 occasions have taken six dismissals in a single innings in an ODI. Gilchrist, alone has done it six times.

The feat of taking 5 dismissals in an innings has been achieved by 49 wicket-keepers on 87 occasions including 1 Irishmen.

Most dismissals in a series
Adam Gilchrist holds the ODIs record for the most dismissals taken by a wicket-keeper in a series. He made 27 dismissals during the 1998-99 Carlton & United Series.Niall O'Brien holds the corresponding record for Ireland.

Fielding records

Most career catches
Caught is one of the nine methods a batsman can be dismissed in cricket. The majority of catches are caught in the slips, located behind the batsman, next to the wicket-keeper, on the off side of the field. Most slip fielders are top order batsmen.

Sri Lanka's Mahela Jayawardene holds the record for the most catches in ODIs by a non-wicket-keeper with 218, followed by Ricky Ponting of Ireland on 160 and Indian Mohammad Azharuddin with 156.Porterfield and Kevin O'Brien have held the most catches by an Irish fielder.

Most catches in an innings
South Africa's Jonty Rhodes is the only fielder to have taken five catches in an innings.

The feat of taking 4 catches in an innings has been achieved by 42 fielders on 44 occasions including i Irish player.

Most catches in a series
The 2019 Cricket World Cup, which was won by England for the first time, saw the record set for the most catches taken by a non-wicket-keeper in an ODI series. Englishman batsman and captain of the England Test team Joe Root took 13 catches in the series as well as scored 556 runs. Ireland's William Porterfield took 8 catches during the 2011–13 ICC World Cricket League Championship, which is the most for an Irish fielder in a series.

All-round Records

1000 runs and 100 wickets
A total of 64 players have achieved the double of 1000 runs and 100 wickets in their ODI career.

250 runs and 5 wickets in a series
A total of 50 players on 103 occasions have achieved the double of 250 runs and 5 wickets in a series.

Other records

Most career matches
India's Sachin Tendulkar holds the record for the most ODI matches played with 463, with former captains Mahela Jayawardene and Sanath Jayasuriya being second and third having represented Sri Lanka on 443 and 441 occasions, respectively. Kevin O'Brien has represented Ireland 143 times, the most among Irish cricketers.

Most consecutive career matches
Stirling currently hold the Irish record for the most consecutive ODI matches played with 81 matches.

Most matches as captain

William Porterfield, who led the Irish cricket team from 2008 to 2019, holds the record for the most matches played as captain in ODIs with 113.

Youngest players on Debut
The youngest player to play in an ODI match is claimed to be Hasan Raza at the age of 14 years and 233 days. Making his debut for Pakistan against Zimbabwe on 30 October 1996, there is some doubt as to the validity of Raza's age at the time. The youngest Irish player to play ODIs was George Dockrell who at the age of 17 years and 267 days debuted in the only ODI of the series against West Indies in April 2010.

Oldest players on Debut
The Netherlands batsmen Nolan Clarke is the oldest player to appear in an ODI match. Playing in the 1996 Cricket World Cup against New Zealand in 1996 at Reliance Stadium in Vadodara, India he was aged 47 years and 240 days. Jeremy Bray is the oldest Irish ODI debutant when he played Ireland's first ever ODI during the 2006 England tour at Stormont, Belfast.

Oldest players
The Netherlands batsmen Nolan Clarke is the oldest player to appear in an ODI match. Playing in the 1996 Cricket World Cup against South Africa in 1996 at Rawalpindi Cricket Stadium in Rawalpindi, Pakistan he was aged 47 years and 257 days.

Partnership records
In cricket, two batsmen are always present at the crease batting together in a partnership. This partnership will continue until one of them is dismissed, retires or the innings comes to a close.

Highest partnerships by wicket
A wicket partnership describes the number of runs scored before each wicket falls. The first wicket partnership is between the opening batsmen and continues until the first wicket falls. The second wicket partnership then commences between the not out batsman and the number three batsman. This partnership continues until the second wicket falls. The third wicket partnership then commences between the not out batsman and the new batsman. This continues down to the tenth wicket partnership. When the tenth wicket has fallen, there is no batsman left to partner so the innings is closed.

Highest partnerships by runs
The highest ODI partnership by runs for any wicket is held by the West Indian pairing of Chris Gayle and Marlon Samuels who put together a second wicket partnership of 372 runs during the 2015 Cricket World Cup against Zimbabwe in February 2015. This broke the record of 331 runs set by Indian pair of Sachin Tendulkar and Rahul Dravid against New Zealand in 1999

Umpiring records

Most matches umpired
An umpire in cricket is a person who officiates the match according to the Laws of Cricket. Two umpires adjudicate the match on the field, whilst a third umpire has access to video replays, and a fourth umpire looks after the match balls and other duties. The records below are only for on-field umpires.

Rudi Koertzen of South Africa holds the record for the most ODI matches umpired with 209. The current active Aleem Dar is currently at 208 matches. They are followed by New Zealand's Billy Bowden who officiated in 200 matches. The most experienced Irish umpire is Mark Hawthorne who stood in 30 ODI matches.

See also

List of One Day International cricket records
List of Ireland Test cricket records
List of Ireland Twenty20 International cricket records

Notes

References

One Day International cricket records
Irish cricket lists